I Believe is a 2016 Singaporean short film directed by then 24-year-old student director Leroy Lim.

The short gave the director a chance at a full-length feature film.

Cast
 Joshua Lim as Peter
 Maxi Lim as Anthony
 Yap Hui Xin as Janice
 Smiley Goh as Paster Benjamin
 Derric Cheong as Peter's friend 1
 Sean Lee Kah Wai as Peter's friend 2
 Faith Toh as Anthony's mother

Production
I Believe was produced in collaboration with Lim's schoolmates from LASALLE College of the Arts, Nikko Koh, 22, and Dhinesh Ravichandran, 25. Veteran female filmmaker Wee Li Lin acted as their mentor for this project.

References

2016 films
Singaporean short films
2010s English-language films